Batrachedra testor is a moth in the family Batrachedridae. It is found in North America, where it has been recorded from Florida.

The wingspan is about 9 mm. Adults have been recorded on wing from January to May.

References

Natural History Museum Lepidoptera generic names catalog

Batrachedridae
Moths of North America
Moths described in 1966